Starye Klyuchi is a rural locality (a selo) in Bichursky District, Republic of Buryatia, Russia. The population was 179 as of 2010. There are 2 streets.

Geography 
Starye Klyuchi is located 43 km west of Bichura (the district's administrative centre) by road. Okino-Klyuchi is the nearest rural locality.

References 

Rural localities in Bichursky District